Márta Egerváry (born 24 March 1943, in Budapest) is a former freestyle and medley swimmer from Hungary, who competed in three consecutive Summer Olympics for her native country, starting in 1960.

Her best individual result was eighth, achieved at the 1964 Olympic Games in 400 m medley. With the Hungarian 4x100 metres medley relay team she was sixth in 1960.

At the European Championships she won a bronze medal in 1962 in 400 m medley for which she was chosen Hungarian Sportswoman of The Year.

References

1943 births
Living people
Hungarian female butterfly swimmers
Olympic swimmers of Hungary
Hungarian female freestyle swimmers
Swimmers at the 1960 Summer Olympics
Swimmers at the 1964 Summer Olympics
Swimmers at the 1968 Summer Olympics
Swimmers from Budapest
European Aquatics Championships medalists in swimming
Universiade medalists in swimming
Universiade gold medalists for Hungary
Universiade bronze medalists for Hungary
Medalists at the 1963 Summer Universiade
Medalists at the 1965 Summer Universiade
Hungarian female breaststroke swimmers
Hungarian female medley swimmers
20th-century Hungarian women